Minuscule 53 (in the Gregory-Aland numbering), ε 444 (Von Soden), is a Greek minuscule manuscript of the New Testament, on parchment leaves. Palaeographically it has been assigned to the 13th or 14th century. It has marginalia.

Description 

The codex contains complete text of the four Gospels on 140 leaves (size ). The text is written in one column per page, 29-33 lines per page. The initial letters in red ink. The manuscript is beautifully written.

There is no a division according to the Ammonian Sections with references to the Eusebian Canons are absent.

It contains Prolegomena, and subscriptions at the end of each Gospel.

Text 

The Greek text of the codex is a representative of the Byzantine text-type. Kurt Aland placed it in Category V. According to the Claremont Profile Method it represents Kx text in Luke 1 and Luke 20. In Luke 10 no profile was made. It creates textual pair with 902.

Textually it is close to Minuscule 271.

History 

The name of scribe was probably Nicholaus (?). The manuscript was examined by John Mill (Selden 1). C. R. Gregory saw it in 1883.

It is currently housed in at the Bodleian Library (Selden Supra 28), at Oxford.

See also 

 List of New Testament minuscules
 Biblical manuscript
 Textual criticism

References

Further reading 

 

Greek New Testament minuscules
13th-century biblical manuscripts
Bodleian Library collection